Das Lied vom Trompeter is an East German film. It was released in 1964.

Cast
 Horst Jonischkan: Fritz Weineck
 Erik Veldre: Paul Hepner
 Doris Abeßer: Käthe Mielfe
 Ezard Haußmann: Georg Füllbrink
 Jürgen Frohriep: Walter Ebersdorf
 Traudl Kulikowsky: Lene Langner
 Fred Delmare: Kleckchen
 Wolfgang Greese: Karl Borsdorff
 Helga Göring: Anna Weineck
 Martin Elbers: Ernst Weineck
 Rolf Römer: Alfons Wieland
 Bruno Carstens: Gustav Merseburg
 Hannjo Hasse: Pietzker

External links
 

1964 films
East German films
1960s German-language films
1960s German films